Ken Henderson (born September 27, 1960) is an American college baseball coach with the Southern Illinois Salukis baseball team. He was named interim head coach before the 2011 season, after Dan Callahan died.  Henderson had also served as interim head coach for the final 20 games of the 1994 season.  He was named permanent head coach after the 2011 season.

Henderson played at Missouri Southern State, graduating in 1983.  He began his coaching career with the Lions as a student assistant coach for the 1983 season.  He then served for three years at Kansas State and three more years as recruiting coordinator at Oral Roberts.  He was credited by Collegiate Baseball with assembling a highly ranked class in 1987.  In 1991, he arrived at Southern Illinois, and added associate head coach duties in 1993.  He coached 35 players at SIU who went on to be drafted, including Jerry Hairston Jr. and Jason Frasor.  After the 2012 season, he was extended by SIU until 2014. On June 3, 2019, Henderson stepped down from his position with Southern Illinois.

Head coaching record
This table depicts Henderson's record as a head coach.

References

Living people
1960 births
Kansas State Wildcats baseball coaches
Missouri Southern Lions baseball coaches
Missouri Southern Lions baseball players
Oral Roberts Golden Eagles baseball coaches
Southern Illinois Salukis baseball coaches
People from Jasper County, Missouri
People from Craig County, Oklahoma